Sandis Ozoliņš (born August 3, 1972), commonly spelled Sandis Ozolinsh  in North America, is a Latvian former professional ice hockey player and coach. During his career in North America, Ozoliņš was a seven-time NHL All-Star, Stanley Cup champion (as a member of the 1995–96 Colorado Avalanche), and Norris Trophy finalist. He is also the all-time leader for goals, assists, points and games played by a Latvian in the NHL and holds several Colorado Avalanche and San Jose Sharks franchise records. Ozoliņš also was the highest paid sportsman in Latvian history, before NBA basketball player Andris Biedriņš succeeded him in 2008. He became the head coach of Dinamo in 2017.

Ozoliņš was drafted in the 1991 NHL Entry Draft by the San Jose Sharks as the 8th pick of the 2nd round, 30th overall. He played for the Sharks, Colorado Avalanche, Carolina Hurricanes, Florida Panthers, Mighty Ducks of Anaheim and New York Rangers. He is often considered a prototype "offensive defenseman," becoming heavily involved in his team's offense and scoring opportunities.

In 2014 Ozoliņš was awarded Order of the Three Stars for his long-standing contributions to Latvian ice hockey and sports.

Playing career

Early playing career
Ozoliņš was drafted 30th overall by the San Jose Sharks in the 1991 NHL Entry Draft and had played for the Kansas City Blades, a minor league team in the International Hockey League. He and Latvian teammate Artūrs Irbe won a Turner Cup with the Blades in 1992.

National Hockey League

San Jose Sharks
Ozoliņš joined the Sharks in 1992–93, scoring 23 points in 37 games. He missed the majority of his rookie season recovering from a knee injury suffered in a game against Philadelphia on December 30, 1992. After recovering from his injury, Ozoliņš ended the 1993–94 season with an 81-game, 26-goal/64-point sophomore effort, leading the league in goals by a defenceman. Ozoliņš helped the Sharks to move beyond the first round of the playoffs for the first time in franchise history, losing in the conference semifinals.

Colorado Avalanche
Ozoliņš began the 1995–96 season with one goal and three assists in seven games for the Sharks before being acquired by the Colorado Avalanche for Owen Nolan on October 26, 1995. In 66 games during his first season, Ozoliņš scored 50 total points, with more than half on the power play. Ozoliņš won the Stanley Cup with the Avalanche in 1996.  The following season Colorado won the Presidents' Trophy. After losing to the Detroit Red Wings in the 1997 conference finals, Ozoliņš finished third in votes for the Norris Trophy, awarded to the league's most outstanding defenceman. In the regular season, he scored a career-high 68 points, second in the league for defencemen after Brian Leetch. Ozoliņš scored his first career hat trick on December 6, 1999 against the Vancouver Canucks. 1999 was his final year in Denver, in which Ozoliņš made $4 million as Colorado's third-highest paid player.

Carolina, Florida and Anaheim
During the 2000 NHL Entry Draft, Ozoliņš was traded to the Carolina Hurricanes for Nolan Pratt and draft picks that became Václav Nedorost, Jared Aulin, and Agris Saviels. The agreement reunited Ozoliņš with fellow Latvian Artūrs Irbe. They had played together in Latvia and San Jose, shared an agent, and together funded a youth hockey organization that buys equipment for children in Latvia. After expiration of Ozoliņš' Avalanche deal, he signed a five-year contract with Carolina worth more than $25 million. "When you have a player like Sandis, you're willing to spend the money," general manager Jim Rutherford said. Ozoliņš didn't help the Hurricanes to advance in the playoffs, playing just one and a half seasons with Carolina before being traded to the Florida Panthers.

Ozoliņš became a Panther after being acquired in 2001–02 mid-season from Carolina along with Byron Ritchie in exchange for Bret Hedican, Kevyn Adams, Tomáš Malec and a draft pick. Ozoliņš made his Panthers debut against Chicago on January 16, 2002. He wore #44 because #8 was already worn by Peter Worrell. Ozoliņš scored 10 goals and 19 assists in the remaining 37 games of the season. The Panthers did not make the playoffs during his time in Florida.

During the 2002–03 season, the Panthers sent Ozoliņš to the Mighty Ducks of Anaheim for Matt Cullen, Pavel Trnka, and a draft pick. During the 2003 NHL All-Star weekend (several days after he had been traded), Ozoliņš skipped the NHL All-Star skills competition where he would have had to wear a Panthers uniform. "Participating in the All-Star Game is one thing, but the skills competition is another," said Ozoliņš, who was voted as an Eastern Conference starter. "It would look really unusual for a player to be representing his old team, so I thought this was the right thing to do." He was fined an undisclosed amount by the league. Upon his arrival with the Ducks, Ozoliņš helped the club reach their first Stanley Cup Final, losing a seven-game series to the New Jersey Devils. In 2003–04, Ozoliņš battled injuries and was limited to 36 games.

NY Rangers and return to San Jose
Following the lockout in 2004–05, Ozoliņš was dealt to the New York Rangers at the trading deadline for a third-round draft pick (which the Rangers had obtained earlier in a trade with the San Jose Sharks). With 14 points in 19 games in the 2005–06 season, Ozoliņš helped his team to advance to the playoffs, for which the Rangers had not qualified since 1997. In the next season on December 18, 2006, on the heels of a 6–1 loss to New Jersey, the Rangers placed Ozoliņš on waivers. After clearing waivers, Ozoliņš was assigned to the Hartford Wolf Pack of the American Hockey League (AHL), but a short while later was put on the injured reserve list due to a knee injury.

Ozoliņš later entered into the league's substance abuse program following a drunk driving arrest. After playing 2 games for the Worcester Sharks of the AHL and being cleared to play by doctors within the league's substance abuse program, he signed a one-year contract with San Jose on November 2, 2007. "That was a big turnaround this summer and I'm finally comfortable with what I am and what has happened, I actually feel pretty good and I do what I have to do and I do what I was advised to do. And I do it for myself and not for anybody else," said Ozoliņš. In the 2007–08 NHL season he scored 3 goals and 13 assists in 39 games for the Sharks. He had a notable highlight reel save against the Anaheim Ducks, where as the puck slipped by goalie Evgeni Nabokov, and Ozoliņš slipped and fell as he made a stick save on the goal line.

Kontinental Hockey League

Dinamo Riga
After his season with the Sharks, Ozoliņš was offered a one-year contract by the Los Angeles Kings worth $800,000, but he declined it and went on hiatus from hockey for a year.

On July 13, 2009, Ozoliņš unexpectedly signed a one-year deal with KHL home country team Dinamo Riga, with whom he started his senior career in 1990. Ozoliņš got back his #8 – the same number which he wore while playing for Dinamo Riga. Ozoliņš was named a captain for the first time in his career. In the 2009–10 KHL season he was the team's leader in points among defensemen, scoring 5 goals and 20 assists in 43 games. In January 2010, Ozoliņš was selected to play on the starting roster for the Jaromír Jágr team in the KHL All-Star game. He was also selected to play in the KHL All-Star skills competition, but, due to a minor injury, only played in the first period and withdrew from the skills competition. On May 18, 2010, Ozoliņš extended his contract with Dinamo for another year, after he declined larger offers from four different KHL teams.

In the first month of the 2010–11 KHL season Ozoliņš was honoured as the league's best defenseman after he registered 1 goal and 11 assists in 11 games, at the time being the league's leader in assists. He was injured in the November 28 game against HC Sibir and missed all of the December due to broken ribs. In January 2011, Ozoliņš was again selected to play on the starting roster in the KHL All-Star game. Before the start of a 2011–12 KHL season Ozoliņš received an offer from KHL Gagarin Cup 2011 winners Salavat Yulaev Ufa to join the team, but he declined it. During the 2011–12 KHL season, league officials confirmed Ozoliņš as captain of the Western Conference team in the All-Star Game 2012 (which took place on January 21, 2012) versus the Eastern Conference team captained by Sergei Fedorov. On July 12, 2012, Dinamo Riga board member Guntis Ulmanis told Latvian radio station Baltkom that Ozoliņš left KHL team Dynamo Riga as a free agent and could receive lucrative offers from Russian clubs. Since joining Riga, Ozoliņš had 22 goals and 65 assists in 158 regular season KHL appearances, serving as the team captain for every game. During his time with Dinamo Riga, Ozoliņš set several franchise records as a defenseman.

Atlant Moscow Oblast
On September 24, 2012, Ozoliņš signed a one-year deal with KHL team Atlant Moscow Oblast. In his only season with Atlant in 2012–13, Ozoliņš was named team captain and immediately served as a fixture on the blueline, producing 2 goals and 20 points in 42 games.

Return home
In the off-season, Ozoliņš made another return as a free agent to Dinamo Riga, signing a one-year contract on May 8, 2013.

Retirement
On May 27, 2014, during an interview on national television he announced his retirement from professional hockey and plans to move into politics. However, he returned to Dinamo Riga as an assistant coach on October 31, 2016. He was promoted to head coach of the team on May 29, 2017.

International play

Ozoliņš, who was born in Latvia, played hockey internationally for the Soviet Union until 1991. His first major international tournament was 1991 World Junior Ice Hockey Championships, where he won a silver medal, losing in the gold medal game to Canada. Following the breakup of the Soviet Union, he played under the new flag of the Commonwealth of Independent States (CIS) and won a gold medal at the 1992 World Junior Championships. During the tournament, the USSR was formally dissolved and the team was renamed as the Commonwealth of Independent States national junior team. Because Ozoliņš and Sergei Zholtok were from Latvia, which wasn't a member of the CIS, some other teams protested, but the protest was denied.

Ozoliņš didn't play again internationally until 1998 due to injuries and the NHL playoff schedule. In 1998, after losing with the Avalanche to the Edmonton Oilers in the first round of the playoffs, Ozoliņš was able to rush to Switzerland and made his debut for Latvia in the elite division, where team Latvia had qualified for the second time since its independence in 1991. At that tournament he registered 1 goal and 2 assists. He again helped for his nation at the Men's World Ice Hockey Championship; he was able to participate because of the Hurricanes loss in the Conference quarterfinals. Latvia finished the tournament in 13th place. He played in next year's championship as well and one game during the 2002 Winter Olympics Ice hockey tournament. In the game versus Slovakia, Ozoliņš registered 4 assists, helping Latvia to a 6–6 tie.

After a three-year absence, Ozoliņš helped Latvia qualify for the 2006 Winter Olympics Ice hockey tournament. It was intended to be his last international tournament; he announced his international retirement to the media following the conclusion of the Olympics.  In spite of his announced retirement he rejoined team Latvia in their bid to qualify for the 2014 Olympics. The Latvian team, including Ozoliņš, did indeed qualify for the 2014 Winter Olympic Games in Sochi (and was named captain), where they upset the Swiss to earn a berth in the quarterfinals, then lost to Canada to finish 8th.

Personal life
Ozoliņš was married to his secondary school schoolmate Sandra for more than 15 years, until May 2010 Ozoliņš submitted an application for divorce. He has two sons – Roberts (born in 1994) and Christopher (born in 1996). During the off-season Ozoliņš resides in Denver, Colorado, and most recently in Jūrmala, Latvia. Ozoliņš was the owner of Vilki OP/LaRocca of the Riga Open Championship until it became defunct in 2006. Ozoliņš also owns other Latvian sports ventures, including Latvia's first 18-hole golf course, Ozo Golf Club. In December 2009, Ozoliņš was voted as 2009's most popular sportsman in Latvia by internet voters.

Career statistics

Regular season and playoffs

International

Awards, honors and records

Colorado Avalanche records
 Most all-time playoff goals by an Avalanche defenseman – 18
 Most all-time playoff assists by an Avalanche defenseman – 49
 Most all-time playoff points by an Avalanche defenseman – 67

Transactions
October 26, 1995 – Traded by the San Jose Sharks to the Colorado Avalanche in exchange for Owen Nolan.
June 24, 2000 – Traded by the Colorado Avalanche, along with Columbus' 2000 2nd round draft choice, to the Carolina Hurricanes in exchange for Nolan Pratt, Carolina's 2000 1st round draft choice, Carolina's 2nd round draft choice and Philadelphia's 2000 2nd round draft choice.
July 24, 2000 – Signed a five-year contract with the Carolina Hurricanes worth more than $25 million.
January 16, 2002 – Traded by the Carolina Hurricanes, along with Byron Ritchie, to the Florida Panthers in exchange for Bret Hedican, Kevyn Adams and Tomáš Malec.
January 30, 2003 – Traded by the Florida Panthers, along with Lance Ward to the Mighty Ducks of Anaheim in exchange for Pavel Trnka, Matt Cullen and Anaheim's 2003 4th round draft choice.
March 9, 2006 – Traded by the Mighty Ducks of Anaheim to the New York Rangers in exchange for New York's 2006 3rd round draft choice.
November 2, 2007 – Signed a one-year deal for $650,000 with the San Jose Sharks.
July 13, 2009 – Signed a one-year deal with the Dinamo Riga.
May 18, 2010 – Extended contract with Dinamo Riga for 2010–11 KHL season.
April 19, 2011 – Extended contract with Dinamo Riga for 2011–12 KHL season.
September 24, 2012 – Signed a one-year deal with the Atlant Moscow Oblast.
May 8, 2013 – Signed a one-year deal with the Dinamo Riga.
May 27, 2014 - Announced his retirement.

References

External links

Sandis Ozoliņš KHL player profile
Sandis Ozoliņš Dinamo Riga player profile
Ozo Golf Club/ 

1972 births
Carolina Hurricanes players
Colorado Avalanche players
Dinamo Riga players
Florida Panthers players
Atlant Moscow Oblast players
Ice hockey players at the 2002 Winter Olympics
Ice hockey players at the 2006 Winter Olympics
Ice hockey players at the 2014 Winter Olympics
Kansas City Blades players
Latvian ice hockey defencemen
Latvian expatriate ice hockey people
Living people
Mighty Ducks of Anaheim players
National Hockey League All-Stars
New York Rangers players
Olympic ice hockey players of Latvia
People from Sigulda
San Francisco Spiders players
San Jose Sharks draft picks
San Jose Sharks players
Stanley Cup champions
Worcester Sharks players
Soviet ice hockey defencemen
Latvian expatriate sportspeople in the United States
Latvian expatriate sportspeople in Russia
Expatriate ice hockey players in the United States
Expatriate ice hockey players in Russia